The BVP M-80, is a tracked Yugoslavian-made infantry fighting vehicle, produced from the 1980s until the country's collapse in the 1990s.

Development
Early research and development of the M-80 began in 1969, with testing of the first completed prototype in 1974. It was first presented publicly in 1975. First examples of the BVP M-80 rolled out in 1979 but full entry to service happened in 1982.

The first production variant was the M-80 which was only made in small numbers. The vehicle used a French-built engine with an output of 260 hp, the same engine as used in AMX-10P. After only a year, Yugoslavia started license production of Daimler-Benz's 315 hp engine in domestic FAMOS factories. This variant received a new designation as M-80A. Around 1000 vehicles were produced before the breakup of the country.

At the time it was produced, M-80A had similar characteristics with existing IFVs like Russian BMP-1 or French AMX 10P. Although many foreign experts compare M-80A with Russian BMP-1, the Yugoslav IFV is a true original design. Unlike the BMP-1 which had 6 road wheels and was armed with 73 mm gun, M-80A had 5 road wheels and had 20 mm gun. M-80A incorporates numerous elements from the French AMX-10P giving it more power and better protection over its counterpart. All M-80s are amphibious and are equipped with twin AT-3 launchers.

It was used extensively during the Yugoslav Wars.

Turret
The standard versions (BVP M-80 and M-80A) mounted a Hispano-Suiza HS.804 20mm autocannon that has an effective range of about 1500 meters and, depending on ammunition type, is able to penetrate around 20mm of RHAe (Rolled Homogeneous Armour equivalency).

In 1978 the technical-military council of Yugoslav People's Army decided that a larger caliber gun would be necessary to counter the increasingly heavy armor of possible enemy armored fighting vehicles and began development of a new turret to house the larger weapon. This requirement led to the development of the Zastava 30mm autocannon M86 in 1985 and a new turret "Vidra" – later designated: M91. In addition to the new gyro stabilized 30mm auto-cannon, the new turret was equipped with smoke grenade launchers, improved day/night sights, and the ability to fire SACLOS 9M14 Malyutka ATGMs. The turret is rotated by servo-hydraulics and the main gun is elevated and depressed by electric motor.

Incremental improvements were made to the design of the Vidra turret throughout the late 1990s and early 2000s. These improvements would eventually be standardized and incorporated into a thoroughly updated turret and designated M91E.  Besides being able to mount the original M86 30mm autocannon, the M91E-I and MM91E-II turrets able to accommodate the dual feed Zastava M89 30mm autocannon.

Development is ongoing on a further modernized turret incorporating more effective ATGM armament. Besides BVP M-80 versions, the Vidra turret is offered for modernization or production with other vehicles such as BTR-50.

Characteristics
The M-80A is armed with one 20 mm gun, co-axial machine gun 7.62 mm and twin launcher for wire-guided anti-tank missiles. It is NBC protected, fire suppression system, inside heating and water ejecting system. It is fully amphibious and can perform crossing of any water barrier without previous preparations. Max. speed at water is 7 km/h. Crew consist of three, driver, commander and gun operator and in the after compartment, there is space for six fully equipped infantrymen who can engage the enemy with personal armament through six gun slits on both vehicle sides and back doors and one squad leader who commands infantry upon exiting the vehicle. Infantry leaves IFV through two doors at the back of the vehicle.

Variants
 M-80 – First production model with 260 hp engine, replaced after 1 year.
 M-80A – Improved version with 320 hp engine, full production.
 M-80A1 or SPAT 30/2 – Improved version with a dual 30mm gun system called "Foka". Prototype only.
 M-80A/98 – Further improvements of M-80A1 with new turret called "Vidra" first designated as M-96 later changed to M80A/98. Publicly presented in 2004;
 M-80A KC – Company commander's vehicle.
 M-80A KB – Battalion commander's vehicle.
 M-80A VK - Turretless commander's vehicle.
 M-80A Sn – Medical, no turret. Single oblong hatch in the roof and single rear door. Carries 4 stretcher patients or 8 seated patients.
 M-80A LT – Tank hunter version with six AT-3 launchers.
 Sava M-90 – SA-13 SAM version, designated Strela-10MJ, prototype.
 MOS – Self-propelled mine layer.
 M-80AK/M-98A – New gun turret with 30 mm M86 cannon or 30 mm dual feed M89 cannon.
 M-80AB1 – Latest upgraded variant including more advanced armour, turret gun control equipment, optronics package, smoke grenade launchers and the ability to mount and launch the most recent 9M14 Malyutka missile variants.
 SPAT 30/2 – Self-propelled anti-aircraft gun. New turret model called "Foka" with two Zastava 30 mm autocannons with elevation from -5 to +85 degrees. The aim-scan gear is J-171 or Motorola 6800. Included receiver of radar data gathered from external Air Force observations radar. Three crew members and 4 soldiers could be transported. Planned to be used as successor and replacement for M-53/59 Praga – 4 models produced.

Operators

Current operators
  – 128, 104 IFV + 24 various support versions, to be replaced by a yet-to-be-determined future western IFV 
  – 320 (+220 in reserve)  – Serbian Army plans to upgrade 220 vehicles to BVP М-80АB1 standard.
  – 35 M-80As donated by Slovenia during the Russo-Ukrainian War.

Former operators
  – Passed on to successor states. The Federal Republic of Yugoslavia fielded 568 in 1998.
 : 30+ in 1998
 : 2 in 1998
 : 62 in 1998, 52 in 2002, 35 vehicles were donated in 2022 as war aid to Ukraine.

References

External links 
 

Amphibious infantry fighting vehicles
Infantry fighting vehicles of Serbia
Infantry fighting vehicles of Yugoslavia
Reconnaissance vehicles
Tracked infantry fighting vehicles
Military vehicles introduced in the 1970s
Infantry fighting vehicles of the Cold War